Angelonia grandiflora is an ornamental plant.

References

Plantaginaceae